Batkovići may refer to the following places:

Places in Bosnia and Herzegovina 

 Batkovići, Čajniče
 Batkovići, Goražde
 Batkovići, Nevesinje

Places in Serbia 

 Batkovići, Priboj